The 8th Anti-Aircraft Division (8th AA Division) was an air defence formation of the British Army during the early years of the Second World War. It defended South West England during The Blitz and the Luftwaffe 'hit and run' raids, but only had a short career.

Mobilisation
The 8th Anti-Aircraft Division was one of five new divisions created on 1 November 1940 by Anti-Aircraft Command to control the growing anti-aircraft (AA) defences of the United Kingdom. The  division was formed by splitting the 5th AA Division, with the new formation taking responsibility for the City of Bristol and the counties of Somerset, Dorset, Devon and Cornwall. Potential targets in this area included the Bristol Aeroplane Company factory and airfield at Filton, and the Royal Navy dockyards at Devonport (Plymouth) and Portland.

The Divisional headquarters (HQ) was at Bristol and the first General Officer Commanding (GOC) was Major-General Robert Allen, who was transferred from commanding the 5th AA Division. The division formed part of I AA Corps, which was created at the same time to cover Southern England and Wales. The fighting units, organised in four AA Brigades, consisted of Heavy (HAA) and Light (LAA) gun units and Searchlight (S/L) units of the Royal Artillery, with major concentrations of HAA guns in the Bristol and Plymouth Gun Defence Areas (GDAs)

The Blitz

When the 8th AA Division was formed the Luftwaffes night Blitz on British cities was already under way. There had previously been daylight raids during the Battle of Britain, notably on Bristol and Portland on 25 September 1940, now the night attacks were stepped up both against London and smaller cities, with the ports of Bristol and Plymouth receiving frequent raids, particularly heavy in March 1941 (the Bristol Blitz and Plymouth Blitz).

In 1939 the scale of HAA guns (3-inch and the newer 3.7-inch and 4.5-inch guns) allocated to the Bristol GDA (covering Bristol and Avonmouth) had been 56, and this was increased to 80 in 1940, but by the end of February 1941 only 36 were in place. This increased to 68 a month later, though further additions to the establishment were already being called for. The position on LAA gunsites was worse: only small numbers of Bofors 40 mm guns were available at the start of the Blitz, and most LAA detachments had to make do with Light machine guns (LMGs).

Order of Battle
The division's composition during the Blitz was as follows:

 46th AA Brigade – Bristol
 76th (Gloucestershire) HAA Rgt
 23rd LAA Rgt – to 5th AA Division by May 1941
 66th (Gloucesters) S/L Rgt (part)
 68th (Monmouthshire Regiment) S/L Rgt
 55th AA Brigade – Plymouth and Falmouth, Cornwall
 56th (Cornwall) HAA Rgt
 118th HAA Rgt (part) – new regiment raised in December 1940; to 9th AA Division by May 1941
 58th (Argyll and Sutherland Highlanders) LAA Rgt – part deployed at Plymouth, part under 65th AA Brigade at Southampton; left to join 11th Support Group in May 1941
 81st S/L Rgt – new unit formed in November 1940 from existing S/L Bty of Cornwall Fortress Royal Engineers
 82nd S/L Rgt – new unit formed in November 1940 from existing S/L Bty of Dorset Fortress Royal Engineers

 60th AA Brigade – Exeter, Yeovil and Portland
 104th HAA Rgt
 44th LAA Rgt
 66th S/L Rgt (part)
 64th AA Brigade – Airfield sector layout
 35th LAA Rgt
 2nd S/L Rgt
 3rd (Ulster) S/L Rgt – converted into 4th (Ulster) LAA Rgt in January 1942
 76th S/L Rgt
 85th S/L Rgt – new unit raised in January 1941
 9th AA 'Z' Rgt – equipped with Z Battery rocket launchers, formed by the 8th AA Division in January 1941
 8th AA Divisional Signals, Royal Corps of Signals (RCS) – formed at Bristol as duplicate of 5th AA Divisional Signals at Reading, Berkshire 
 8th AA Divisional Royal Army Service Corps (RASC)
 191st, 915th and 917th Companies
 8th AA Divisional Company, Royal Army Medical Corps (RAMC)
 8th AA Divisional Workshop Company, Royal Army Ordnance Corps (RAOC)

Mid-War
By October 1941 the availability of S/L control radar was sufficient to allow AA Command's S/L sites to be 'declustered' into single-light sites spaced at 10,400-yard intervals in 'Indicator Belts' along the coast and approaches to the GDAs, and 'Killer Belts' at  spacing to cooperate with the RAF's Night-fighters.

Early in 1942 the Luftwaffe began a new wave of attacks on British cities (the Baedeker Blitz): Exeter and undefended Bath were hit in March, April and May, and Weston-super-Mare in June. New GDAs were established at Exeter, Taunton, Bath and Salisbury.

Newly formed AA units joined the division, the HAA and support units increasingly becoming 'Mixed' units, indicating that women of the Auxiliary Territorial Service (ATS) were fully integrated into them. At the same time, experienced units were posted away to train for service overseas. This led to a continual turnover of units, which accelerated in 1942 with the preparations for the invasion of North Africa (Operation Torch) and the need to transfer AA units  to counter the Baedeker raids and the Luftwaffes hit-and-run attacks against South Coast towns.

Those AA units in the War Office (WO) Reserve rostered for overseas deployment were lent back to AA Command when not required for training. One of these, 103rd HAA Rgt, was moved down from Merseyside, which was rarely attacked by this stage of the war, to reinforce the 8th AA Division in Cornwall in April 1942, establishing its batteries at St Ives, Truro and Penzance under the 55th AA Brigade.

In July, the 103rd HAA Rgt was sent for a short attachment to the 11th AA Brigade (the mobile training brigade in Hampshire) and was relieved by 79th (Hertfordshire Yeomanry) HAA Rgt which had just completed training with the 11th AA Brigade. The 79th HAA Regiment occupied sites at Hayle, Truro and Penzance on 14 July and the Penzance and Truro guns were in action against raiders early the next morning. The deployment lasted three weeks before the regiment left for further training and the 103rd HAA Rgt returned.

In West Cornwall the main threat was from low level daylight 'hit and run' raids by single engined Luftwaffe aircraft (such as attacks by pairs of Focke-Wulf Fw 190s on St Ives on 28 August and Truro on 7 September), which were difficult for HAA guns to engage. Night raids on Truro on 24 September and on Penzance two nights later were engaged by the regiment with both HAA and light machine guns.

In August 1942, the 64th AA Brigade was transferred from the 8th AA Division to the 3rd AA Division, a HQ brought down from Scotland to handle the increased workload along the South Coast.

Order of Battle
During this period the division was composed as follows (temporary attachments omitted):

 46th AA Brigade
 59th (Essex Regiment) HAA Rgt – from the 6th AA Division December 1941; to WO control as part of the field force March 1942; later to Operation Torch
 76th (Gloucestershire) HAA Rgt – to the 69th AA Brigade by December 1941
 104th HAA Rgt – to the 5th AA Division in December 1941
 112th HAA Rgt – from the 11th AA Division by May 1941; to the 9th AA Division by December 1941
 116th HAA Rgt – new unit formed in November 1940; to the 55th AA Brigade by December 1941
 119th HAA Rgt – from the 1st AA Division by May 1941; to the 64th AA Brigade by December 1941
 133rd (Mixed) HAA Rgt – new unit formed September 1941
 140th HAA Rgt – new unit formed December 1941; to the 69th AA Brigade by May 1942
 150th (Mixed) HAA Rgt – new unit formed February 1942
 165th HAA Rgt – new unit formed July 1942
 36th LAA Rgt – from the 1st AA Division by May 1941; to the 69th AA Brigade Summer 1941
 47th LAA Rgt – from the 69th AA Brigade by December 1941; to Operation Torch 1942
 133rd LAA Rgt – from the 69th AA Brigade July 1942
 66th S/L Rgt – to the 69th AA Brigade Summer 1941
 68th S/L Rgt – to the 69th AA Brigade Summer 1941
 1st AA 'Z' Rgt – from the 1st AA Division by May 1941, returned by December 1941
 55th AA Brigade 
 56th HAA Rgt– as above; left for India in December 1941
 79th (Hertfordshire Yeomanry) HAA Rgt – from the 11th AA Brigade for July 1942
 103rd HAA Rgt – from the 4th AA Division May 1942
 116th HAA Rgt – from the 46th AA Brigade by December 1941
 162nd (Mixed) HAA Rgt – new unit formed June 1942
 166th (Mixed) HAA Rgt – new unit formed August 1942
 36th LAA Rgt – from the 69th AA Brigade by December 1941; left for India in April 1942
 44th LAA Rgt – from the 9th AA Division January 1942 (previously the 60th AA Brigade ); left for India in March 1942
 46th LAA Rgt – from the 9th AA Division by May 1941
 55th (Devonshire) LAA Rgt – from WO Reserve in April 1942; later to Ceylon
 137th LAA Rgt – new unit formed February 1942
 29th (Kent) S/L Rgt – from the 6th AA Division January 1942; to the 60th AA Brigade June 1942
 81st S/L Rgt – as above; converted into unbrigaded 131st LAA Rgt in March 1942
 82nd S/L Rgt – to the 64th AA Brigade December 1941
 85th S/L Rgt – from the 64th AA Brigade by December 1941; converted into 132nd LAA Rgt in the 5th AA Division in March 1942
 9th AA 'Z' Rgt – from the 60th AA Brigade by December 1941
 60th AA Brigade 
 108th HAA Rgt – from Orkney and Shetland Defences (OSDEF) by September 1942
 12th (Finsbury Rifles) LAA Rgt – from the 1st AA Division by May 1941; left AA Command and joined WO Reserve June 1941, later to Persia and Iraq Command (PAIFORCE)
 44th LAA Rgt – to the 9th AA Division by December 1941; then to the 55th AA Brigade January 1942
 67th LAA Rgt – from the 3rd AA Division by September 1942
 29th (Kent) S/L Rgt – from the 55th AA Brigade June 1942
 74th (Essex Fortress) S/L Rgt – from the 6th AA Division January 1942
 76th S/L Rgt – from the 64th AA Brigade December 1941; to the 69th AA Brigade August 1942
 88th S/L Rgt – new unit formed in March 1941
 89th S/L Rgt – new unit formed in March 1941; converted into 133rd LAA Rgt March 1942; to the 69th AA Brigade June 1942
 9th AA 'Z' Rgt – to the 55th AA Brigade by December 1941
 64th AA Brigade – Left August 1942
 98th HAA Rgt – from the 4th AA Division May 1942
 119th HAA Rgt – from the 46th AA Brigade by December 1941; to the 9th AA Division June 1942
 35th LAA Rgt – left in November 1941 for Singapore, where it was captured in February 1942
 75th (Middlesex) LAA Rgt – joined from unbrigaded by December 1941; left in July 1942, later in invasion of Sicily (Operation Husky)
 87th LAA Rgt – new unit formed October 1941; to the 9th AA Division June 1942
 127th (Queens) LAA Rgt – converted from 63rd (Queens) S/L Rgt, joined July 1942
 2nd S/L Rgt – as above
 3rd S/L Rgt – to the 69th AA Brigade December 1941
 76th S/L Rgt – to the 60th AA Brigade December 1941
 82nd S/L Rgt – from the 55th AA Brigade December 1941
 85th S/L Rgt – to the 55th AA Brigade by December 1941
 69th AA Brigade – new formation joined June 1941
 76th (Gloucestershire) HAA Rgt – from the 46th AA Brigade by December 1941; to Operation Torch by November 1942
 140th HAA Rgt – from the 46th AA Brigade by May 1942
 24th LAA Rgt – from the 5th AA Division; to India 1942
 36th LAA Rgt – from the 46th AA Brigade on formation; to the 55th AA Brigade by December 1941
 47th LAA Rgt – from the 9th AA Division on formation; to the 46th AA Brigade by December 1941
 72nd LAA Rgt – from the 9th AA Division May 1942; left July 1942, later in Operation Torch
 87th LAA Rgt – from the 9th AA Division (previously the 64 AA Brigade) in August 1942
 133rd LAA Rgt – from the 60th AA Brigade June 1942, to the 46 AA Brigade July 1942
 3rd S/L Rgt – from the 60th AA Brigade December 1941; converted into unbrigaded 4th (Ulster) LAA Rgt in January 1942
 66th S/L Rgt – from the 46th AA Brigade on formation
 68th S/L Rgt – from the 46th AA Brigade on formation
 76th S/L Rgt – from the 60th AA Brigade August 1942

The increased sophistication of Operations Rooms and communications was reflected in the growth in support units, which attained the following organisation by May 1942:
 8th AA Division Mixed Signal Unit HQ, RCS
 HQ No 1 Company
 8th AA Division Mixed Signal Office Section
 307th AA Gun Operations Room Mixed Signal Section (Bristol GDA)
 46th AA Brigade Signal Office Mixed Sub-Section
 69th AA Brigade Signal Office Mixed Sub-Section
 110th RAF Fighter Sector Sub-Section (RAF Colerne)
 19th AA Line Maintenance Section
 HQ No 2 Company
 55th AA Brigade Signal Office Mixed Sub-Section
 116th RAF Fighter Sector Sub-Section (RAF Portreath)
 306th AA Gun Operations Room Mixed Signal Section (Plymouth GDA)
 318th AA Gun Operations Room Mixed Signal Section (Falmouth)
 20th AA Line Maintenance Section
 HQ No 3 Company
 60th AA Brigade Signal Office Mixed Sub-Section
 120th RAF Fighter Sector Sub-Section (RAF Exeter)
 64th AA Brigade Signal Office Mixed Sub-Section
 113th RAF Fighter Sector Sub-Section (RAF Middle Wallop)
 305th AA Gun Operations Room Mixed Signal Section (Portland)
 21st AA Line Maintenance Section
 HQ 8th AA Div RASC
 191st, 915th, 917th Companies
 8th AA Div RAMC
 8th AA Div Workshop Company, RAOC
 8th AA Div Radio Maintenance Company, RAOC

The RAOC companies became part of the new Royal Electrical and Mechanical Engineers (REME) during 1942.

Disbandment
A reorganisation of AA Command in October 1942 saw the AA divisions disbanded and replaced by a number of AA Groups more closely aligned with the groups of RAF Fighter Command. The 8th AA Division merged with the 5th AA Division into the 3rd AA Group based at Bristol and cooperating with No. 10 Group RAF. Major-General Allen retired. The 5th and 8th Divisional Signals re-amalgamated at Bristol as the 3rd AA Group Signals. Postwar the unit became The 57th (City and County of Bristol) Signals Squadron, today part of 39 (Skinners) Signal Regiment.

General Officer Commanding
The 8th AA Division only had one commander during its existence:
 Major-General Robert Hall Allen, MC (11 November 1940 – 30 September 1942)

Notes

References

 Basil Collier, History of the Second World War, United Kingdom Military Series: The Defence of the United Kingdom, London: HM Stationery Office, 1957.
 Gen Sir Martin Farndale, History of the Royal Regiment of Artillery: The Years of Defeat: Europe and North Africa, 1939–1941, Woolwich: Royal Artillery Institution, 1988/London: Brasseys, 1996, .
 J.B.M. Frederick, Lineage Book of British Land Forces 1660–1978, Vol II, Wakefield, Microform Academic, 1984, .
 
 Norman E.H. Litchfield, The Territorial Artillery 1908–1988 (Their Lineage, Uniforms and Badges), Nottingham: Sherwood Press, 1992, .
 Cliff Lord & Graham Watson, Royal Corps of Signals: Unit Histories of the Corps (1920–2001) and its Antecedents, Solihull: Helion, 2003, .
 Maj-Gen R.F.H. Nalder, The Royal Corps of Signals: A History of its Antecedents and Developments (Circa 1800–1955), London: Royal Signals Institution, 1958.
 Sir Frederick Pile's despatch: "The Anti-Aircraft Defence of the United Kingdom from 28th July, 1939, to 15th April, 1945" London Gazette 18 December 1947.
 Brig N.W. Routledge, History of the Royal Regiment of Artillery: Anti-Aircraft Artillery 1914–55, London: Royal Artillery Institution/Brassey's, 1994, .
 Col J.D. Sainsbury, The Hertfordshire Yeomanry Regiments, Royal Artillery, Part 2: The Heavy Anti-Aircraft Regiment 1938–1945 and the Searchlight Battery 1937–1945; Part 3: The Post-war Units 1947–2002, Welwyn: Hertfordshire Yeomanry and Artillery Trust/Hart Books, 2003, .

External sources
 British Army website
 Anti-Aircraft Command (1940) at British Military History
 Generals of World War II
 Royal Artillery 1939–1945

Military units and formations established in 1940
Anti-aircraft divisions of the British Army
Military units and formations disestablished in 1942
Military units and formations in Bristol